The 1992/93 FIS Nordic Combined World Cup was the 10th world cup season, a combination of ski jumping and cross-country skiing organized by FIS. It started on 5 Dec 1992 in Vuokatti, Finland and ended on 20 March 1993 in Štrbské Pleso, Slovakia.

Calendar

Men

Standings

Overall 

Standings after 8 events.

Nations Cup 

Standings after 8 events.

References

External links
FIS Nordic Combined World Cup 1992/93 

1992 in Nordic combined
1993 in Nordic combined
FIS Nordic Combined World Cup